is the 13th single by Japanese singer Ai Otsuka, released on the Avex Trax label. It is also her third and final single released in 2006.

The ballad was used as the theme song of the movie Tada, Kimi o Aishiteru. The title of the movie was originally Heavenly Forest, but was changed to a phrase from the song's lyrics after the director listened to the song.

The b-side, "Hanikami Jane", an upbeat song, was used in a television commercial for Look: a la mode chocolate. The third track is a live version of "Haneari Tamago", a song originally on Otsuka's 3rd album Love Cook.

The single debuted at number 2 during its first week, selling 77,570 copies and making it Otsuka's highest debut sales of the year. "Ren'ai Shashin" was second only to Kisarazu Cat's Eye's "Seaside Byebye". It sold a total of 129,855 copies in 2006, making it the 75th best-selling single of the year.

Track listing

Live performances
25 September 2006 – Hey! Hey! Hey! Special
20 October 2006 – Music Station
20 October 2006 – PopJam
26 October 2006 – Utaban
22 November 2006 – Best Hit Kyodai
29 November 2006 – Best Artist
7 December 2006 – FNS Music Festival
22 December 2006 – Music Station Super Live 2006
29 December 2006 – Sakigake Ongaku Banzuke - "Frienger" + "Ren'ai Shashin"
30 December 2006 – 48th Japan Record Awards
31 December 2006 – Kouhaku Uta Gassen

Charts
Oricon Sales Chart (Japan)

2006 singles
Ai Otsuka songs
Songs written by Ai Otsuka
2006 songs
Avex Trax singles
Japanese film songs